Simone Rosso (born 10 November 1995) is an Italian professional footballer who plays as a winger for  club Rimini.

Career
Rosso is a youth exponent from Torino. He made his Serie A debut on 24 May 2015 at San Siro against Milan, replacing Josef Martínez after 71 minutes in a 3–0 away defeat.

On 6 August 2015, he was loaned to Brescia in Serie B. He made his debut for Brescia on 5 September, in a 2–0 defeat away to Cesena; in July 2016 the loan was renewed and he returned to Brescia.

In January 2017, he returned from loan, and was loaned again, to Alessandria in Lega Pro. In July, he was sold outright to Pro Vercelli in Serie B.

On 29 January 2021, he joined Casertana on loan with an option to purchase.

On 9 September 2021, he signed for Teramo.

On 19 August 2022, Rosso moved to Rimini.

Career statistics

Club

Honours

Club
Torino
Campionato Primavera (1): 2014–15

References

External links

1995 births
People from Pinerolo
Footballers from Piedmont
Sportspeople from the Metropolitan City of Turin
Living people
Italian footballers
Association football midfielders
Serie A players
Serie B players
Serie C players
Torino F.C. players
Brescia Calcio players
U.S. Alessandria Calcio 1912 players
F.C. Pro Vercelli 1892 players
A.C. Reggiana 1919 players
Mantova 1911 players
Casertana F.C. players
S.S. Teramo Calcio players
Rimini F.C. 1912 players
Italy youth international footballers